Torrid Holdings Inc. is an American women's retail chain formerly owned by Hot Topic. While it is still owned by Sycamore Partners, owners of Hot Topic, in 2015, the company branched off to become Torrid, LLC. The store offers plus-size clothing and accessories for women size 10-30. Torrid began operations in April 2001. The first location opened in the Brea Mall in Brea, California. As of 2020, Torrid has over 600 stores in operation across 36 states in the United States. Torrid opened its first store in 2001, and an international store in Canada (Toronto) in August 2015. In July 2021, the company went public on the New York Stock Exchange, under the symbol CURV.

Products
The store's clothing styles are aimed at women. In 2005, Torrid expanded its merchandise selection to include styles distinct from its parent company, Hot Topic. Torrid sells accessories, shoes, jewelry, novelty tee shirts, fashion tops, pants, Capri pants, shorts, skirts, dresses, outerwear, intimate apparel, hosiery, gifts, and beauty products.

Models

In February 2014, Georgina Burke was named the first face of Torrid and signed a one-year contract. In December 2014, Philomena Kwao was signed as a second face of Torrid.

In 2015, Torrid launched their first model search, inviting customers to apply and audition to become the next face of Torrid. Over 14,000 people auditioned, with the winner being Lyanna Lynette. In May 2016, it was announced that the brand would be doing a second model search to find their spokesmodel for 2017.

Torrid held its first fashion show at New York Fashion Week in September 2017.

References

External links

Clothing retailers of the United States
Retail companies established in 2001
American companies established in 2001
Companies based in the City of Industry, California
2001 establishments in California
Companies listed on the New York Stock Exchange
2021 initial public offerings
Clothing companies established in 2001
2000s fashion
2010s fashion